James Francis McMillan (10 April 1948 – 22 February 2010) was a Scottish historian and author, head of the History Department of the University of Strathclyde, a fellow of the Royal Society of Edinburgh and Professor of History at the University of Edinburgh.

Early years
McMillan was born in Glasgow on 10 April 1948. He grew up in Paisley and attended St Mirin's Academy. He graduated in modern history from the University of Glasgow in 1969 and obtained his doctorate from Balliol College, Oxford.

Academic career
McMillan was a specialist in the history of modern France. He was a lecturer at York University from 1972 to 1992 and a professor of European history at the University of Strathclyde in Glasgow, where he headed the Department of History. In 1996, McMillan was named a fellow of the Royal Society of Edinburgh. Three years later, in 1999, he was appointed to the Richard Pares chair of history at the University of Edinburgh

Death and legacy

On 22 February 2010 McMillan died of cancer at his home in Airdrie. He was 61. His funeral mass took place at St Mirin's Cathedral in Paisley where the eulogy was given by Professor Tom Devine.

Works

Housewife or Harlot: The Place of Women in French Society, 1870–1940 (1981).
Dreyfus to De Gaulle: Politics and Society in France 1898–1969 (1985).
France and Women, 1789–1914 (2000).

References

1948 births
2010 deaths
Writers from Paisley, Renfrewshire
Scottish Roman Catholics
Alumni of the University of Glasgow
Alumni of Balliol College, Oxford
People educated at St Mirin's Academy
Academics of the University of Edinburgh